The Train is a 2011 Malayalam thriller film written and directed by Jayaraj, and starring Mammootty, Jayasurya and Sheena Chohan. The film is based on the 11 July 2006 Mumbai train bombings. It was earlier titled as Track with Rahman. It was released on May 27, 2011 and received a dubbed release in Hindi and Tamil.

Synopsis
The film is based on the 11 July 2006 Mumbai train bombings. The film is a take on the lives of Malayalee families affected by the bomb blasts. Mammootty plays a police officer who is a keen observer. Jayasurya plays a singer who travelled on one of the trains. The story involves bomb blasts in seven different railways (stations and on train).

Cast
Mammootty as Kedarnath
Jayasurya as Karthik
Sheena Chohan as Kedarnath's wife
Sabitha Jayaraj as Raziya
Jagathy Sreekumar as Joseph
Sai Kumar as Haneefa
Salim Kumar as Ramu
Kota Srinivasa Rao as Yogesh Thivari
Anchal Sabharwal as Meera
Zeenath as Suhana's Mother
Valsala Menon as Allu's Grandmother
Charanpreet Singh as DJ Friend

Soundtrack 
The film's soundtrack contains 7 songs, all composed by Srinivas. Lyrics were by Rafeeq Ahamed and Jayaraj.

Production
The film was launched on by Kuttamath Films. The movie is expected to be completed in three schedules.

References

External links
 Official Website
 Film review by Deccan Chronicle
 Film review by Rediff.com
 

2010s Malayalam-language films
2011 thriller films
2011 films
Films scored by Srinivas
Films about terrorism in India
Fictional portrayals of the Maharashtra Police
Films shot in Mumbai
Indian films based on actual events
Indian thriller films
Thriller films based on actual events
Films directed by Jayaraj